The Party is the eponymous debut album by the band of the same name.  It was the first full-length release on Hollywood Records, which was released August 1990. The Party worked with the industry's top writers and producers at the time, such as Stephen Bray, Jellybean Benitez, Andre Cymone, and Deborah Gibson.

The album produced two U.S. charting singles:  "That's Why" reached #55 on the Billboard Hot 100 and #52 on Cash Box.  And its follow-up, "Summer Vacation," reached #86 after having peaked a year earlier at #72 in the summer of 1990 as an advance single.

Track listing
"That's Why" (Stephen Bray, Linda Mallah) - 4:43; Lead vocals – Albert
"Coulda, Shoulda, Woulda" (Michael Price, Terry Lupton, Mark Holden) - 4:02; Lead vocals – Deedee
"I Found Love" (Anne Preven) - 3:33; Lead vocals – Tiffini & Damon
"Walkin' in the Rain" (Barry Mann, Cynthia Weil, Phil Spector) - 3:52; Lead vocals – Deedee
"Sugar is Sweet" (Billy Steinberg, Tom Kelly) - 4:13; Lead vocals –Deedee & Albert
"I Wanna be Your Boyfriend" (T.V. Dunbar, J.W. Gangwer) - 3:45; Lead vocals – Chase
"Summer Vacation" (Albert Fields, Chase Hampton, Damon Pampolina, DJ Dino, MC Gizmo,  Matt Dike, Michael Ross) 4:56; Lead vocals – Damon & Albert
"I'm Just Wishin'" (Sammy McKinney, Michael Monagan) - 3:44; Lead vocals – Tiffini
"Storm Me" (Wayne Hammer, Jeff Slater) - 3:48; Lead vocals – Albert
"Dancing in the City" (Billy Steinberg, Tom Kelly) - 4:48; Lead vocals – Tiffini
"Rodeo" (Julian Raymond, Chase Hampton) - 4:28; Lead vocals – Chase
"Ton of Bricks" (Deborah Gibson) - 3:53; Lead vocals – Damon

References

1990 debut albums
Hollywood Records albums
The Party (band) albums